Bec de corbin (Modern French: Bec de corbeau ) is a type of polearm and war hammer that was popular in medieval Europe. The name is Old French for "raven's beak". Similar to the Lucerne hammer, it consists of a modified hammer's head and spike mounted atop a long pole. Unlike the Lucerne hammer, the bec de corbin was used primarily with the "beak" or fluke to attack instead of the hammer head. The hammer face balancing the beak was often blunt instead of the multi-pronged Lucerne, and the beak tended to be stouter; better designed for tearing into plate armor, mail, or gambeson. The spike mounted on the top of the head was also not nearly as long and thin as on the Lucerne. Bec de corbin is sometimes used as a general term to describe several types of war hammer, such as mauls and horseman's picks. A similar name, bec de faucon (meaning "falcon's beak"), refers to a related weapon called a pollaxe or, more specifically, to the hook on its reverse side.

External links
Spotlight: The Medieval Poleaxe, by Alexi Goranov

Medieval polearms